Craig Alpert is an American film editor.  Alpert has been in the industry for over 20 years and has edited over 20 feature films.  Alpert began his career as an assistant editor at Pixar, where he worked on films such as Toy Story 2.  He then worked as an assistant editor on The Matrix Reloaded, Hulk, Meet the Fockers, and as an additional editor on The 40-Year-Old Virgin, and Talladega Nights: The Ballad of Ricky Bobby. Alpert has since gone on to edit several high-profile films.   Alpert was nominated for an ACE Award in 2021 for his work on Borat Subsequent Moviefilm as well in 2018 for his work on Deadpool 2.
In 2007 Alpert was selected by the Hollywood Reporter as one of three film editors spotlighted in their “Crafts, the Next Generation” special issue.

Filmography

References

External links
 

American film editors
Living people
Year of birth missing (living people)